Rita Trapanese (8 May 1951 – 10 August 2000) was an Italian figure skater. She was the 1972 European silver medalist and the 1971 bronze medalist. She represented Italy at the 1968 Winter Olympics, where she placed 25th at the age of 16, and at the 1972 Winter Olympics, where she placed 7th.

Competitive highlights

References

 
 Sports-reference profile

Italian female single skaters
Olympic figure skaters of Italy
Figure skaters at the 1968 Winter Olympics
Figure skaters at the 1972 Winter Olympics
Figure skaters from Milan
1951 births
2000 deaths
European Figure Skating Championships medalists